Sirikit; born Mom Rajawongse Sirikit Kitiyakara (12 August 1932) is the queen mother of Thailand. She was Queen of Thailand as the wife of Bhumibol Adulyadej (or King Rama IX) and is the mother of the current King Vajiralongkorn (or King Rama X). She met Bhumibol in Paris, where her father was Thai ambassador. They married in 1950, shortly before Bhumibol's coronation. Sirikit was appointed queen regent in 1956, when the king entered the Buddhist monkhood for a period of time. Sirikit has one son and three daughters with the king. Consort of the monarch who was the world's longest-reigning head of state, she was also the world's longest-serving queen consort. Sirikit suffered a stroke on 21 July 2012 and has since refrained from public appearances.

Early life and family
Sirikit was born on 12 August 1932, at the home of Lord Vongsanuprabhand, her maternal grandfather. She is the eldest daughter and the third child of Prince Nakkhatra Mangkala Kitiyakara, the son of Prince Kitiyakara Voralaksana, and Mom Luang Bua Snidvongs (1909–1999). Her name, which was given by Queen Rambai Barni, means "the greatness of Kitiyakara".

She had three siblings, two elder brothers and a younger sister:
 Mom Rajawongse Kalyanakit Kitiyakara, M.D. (20 September 1929 – 15 May 1987)
 Mom Rajawongse Adulakit Kitiyakara (2 November 1930 – 5 May 2004)
 Mom Rajawongse Busba Kitiyakara (born 2 August 1934)

Sirikit was raised by her maternal grandparents for a year after her birth, since her father was in the United States to work as the secretary of the Siamese Embassy at Washington, D.C. Her mother joined her husband three months later. When she was one year old, her parents returned to Thailand. Sirikit lived together with her family in Deves Palace, near the Chao Phraya River, Bangkok.

As a child, Sirikit often visited her paternal grandmother. Once in 1933, she travelled with Princess Absornsaman Devakula following King Prajadhipok's tour in Songkhla.

Education

At age four, Sirikit attended the Kindergarten College at Rajini School (sometimes called the Queen's College), where she studied at the primary level. During that time the Pacific War was being fought. Bangkok was bombed many times, especially the rail lines, making travel unsafe. She therefore moved to Saint Francis Xavier Convent School, since it was near the palace. She studied at Saint Francis Xavier from her second primary year through the early secondary level.

In 1946, with the war now over, her father moved to the United Kingdom as the ambassador to the Court of St James's, taking his family with him. Sirikit was then 13 and completed her secondary education. While in England she learned to play the piano and became fluent in English and French. Because of her father's work as a diplomat, the family moved to other countries, including Denmark and France. While in France, she studied at a music academy in Paris.

Also in France, Sirikit met King Bhumibol Adulyadej, who was related to her, since both were descendants of King Chulalongkorn (Rama V). At that time, Bhumibol had ascended to the throne and was studying in Switzerland. Bhumibol and Sirikit (as well as a few other students) were staying at the Royal Thai Embassy in Paris. Sirikit accompanied the king as he visited various tourist attractions, and they found that they had much in common.

Marriage
On 4 October 1948, while Bhumibol was driving a Fiat Topolino on the Geneva-Lausanne road, he collided into the rear of a braking truck 10 km outside of Lausanne. He injured his back and incurred cuts on his face that cost him most of the sight in one eye. He subsequently wore an ocular prosthetic. While he was hospitalised in Lausanne, Sirikit visited him frequently. She met his mother, The Princess Mother Sangwan, who asked her to continue her studies nearby so that the king could get to know her better. Bhumibol selected a boarding school for her in Lausanne, Riante Rive. A quiet engagement in Lausanne followed on 19 July 1949, and the couple married on 28 April 1950, just a week before his coronation.

Establishment of the Queen

The marriage took place at Srapathum Palace. Queen Sri Savarindira, the Queen Grandmother presided over the marriage ceremony. Both the king and Sirikit signed on line 11 of their certificate of marriage. As she was not yet 18, her parents also signed, on line 12 directly under her signature. She later received the Order of the Royal House of Chakri, and became queen. After the coronation ceremony on 5 May 1950, both went back to Switzerland to continue their studies, and returned to Bangkok in 1952.

Issue

Regency

When the king undertook the traditional period as a Buddhist monk in 1956, Queen Sirikit acted as regent. She performed her duties so well that she was officially named the Regent of Thailand and the King gave her the title 'Somdet Phra Nang Chao Sirikit Phra Borommarachininat' on his birthday, 5 December 1956. She became the second Siamese queen regent in Thai history. The first was Queen Saovabha Phongsri of Siam, who served as regent when her husband King Chulalongkorn travelled to Europe, and later became Queen Sri Patcharindra.

Health
At dawn on 21 July 2012, Queen Sirikit felt unsteady and staggered while exercising at Siriraj Hospital, where King Bhumibol Adulyadej resided. After performing magnetic resonance imaging, a team of physicians determined that she had suffered an ischemic stroke.

The queen was treated and has refrained from public appearances since, including the grand audience granted by her husband on his 85th birthday from the Ananta Samakhom Hall on 5 December 2012.

On 29 November 2016, the palace announced that the queen had been discharged from the hospital and has returned to the Chitralada Royal Villa due to her recovery.

Cultural status
Queen Sirikit's birthday, like the king's, is a national holiday, and is also Mothers' Day in Thailand. She is particularly revered in the more remote and traditional parts of the country, where the monarchy is regarded as semi-divine. Her work in promoting tolerance and understanding for the Muslim minorities in the southernmost provinces of Pattani, Yala and Narathiwat have made her especially popular amongst Thai Muslims. The queen has a strong bond with southern Thailand, and she formerly spent months in the Muslim-majority provinces every year. She is considered to be one of the more quiet diplomats.

Books and writing

Queen Sirikit published In Memory of my European Trip in 1964, which described her time in Europe with the king. It was this book that revealed that she was a talented writer. Moreover, she has composed songs for performance by The Handsome Band, the band of the palace.

The songs she composed were:
 Chao Chom Khwan (เจ้าจอมขวัญ)
 That Thoe (ทาสเธอ)
 Sai Yut (สายหยุด)
 Nang Yaem (นางแย้ม)

Honours and awards
In 1976, the Thai government honored the queen by declaring her birthday a national holiday. The Queen's birthday is celebrated on 12 August each year.

Volunteer Defense Corps of Thailand Rank
 Volunteer Defense Corps General

Foreign honours
 : 
 Grand Cross of The Order of Merit of the Italian Republic
 :
 Dame Grand Cross of the Order of Isabella the Catholic (3 November 1960)
 Dame Grand Cross of the Royal and Distinguished Spanish Order of Charles III (13 November 1987)
 : 
 Special Grand Cordon of the Order of Propitious Clouds (1963)
 : 
 Grand Star of the Decoration of Honour for Services to the Republic of Austria

Eponyms
Queen Sirikit is well known for her charitable work, where she is the honorary president of the Thai Red Cross, a post she has held since 1956. She gained new prominence in this role in the aftermath of the tsunami disaster in southern Thailand in December 2004. She has also been active in relief work for the many refugees from Cambodia and Myanmar in Thailand.

Many things in Thailand have been named after the Queen:
 the Queen Sirikit National Institute of Child Health, children's hospital
 the Queen Sirikit Medical Center building, Ramathibodi Hospital
 the Queen Sirikit Centre for Breast Cancer, a new 10-storey hospital in Bangkok
 the Queen Sirikit National Convention Center in Bangkok
 the Queen Sirikit Park in Bangkok
 the Sirikit Dam on the Nan River, Uttaradit Province
 the Queen Sirikit Botanic Garden, Chiang Mai Province
 the Queen Sirikit Arboretum Garden, Pathum Thani Province
 the Queen Sirikit Cup, an annual Asian-Pacific golfing event
 the Queen Sirikit Crab (Thaiphusa sirikit)
 the Queen Sirikit Rose
 the Queen's Cup, annual football competition

The queen is also active in promoting Thai culture and history, mainly through her initiative in the making of the Thai movie The Legend of Suriyothai, one of the most lavish and expensive Thai movies ever made.

Ancestry

See also 
 List of covers of Time magazine (1960s)

References

External links

|-

1932 births
Living people
20th-century Thai women
20th-century Chakri dynasty
21st-century Thai women
21st-century Chakri dynasty
Thai queens consort
Bhumibol Adulyadej
Kitiyakara family
Mahidol family
Regents of Thailand
20th-century women rulers
Field marshals of Thailand
Marshals of the Royal Thai Air Force
People from Bangkok
Centro Escolar University alumni
Network monarchy

Order of Chula Chom Klao
Dames Grand Cross of the Order of the Direkgunabhorn
Recipients of the Dushdi Mala Medal, Pin of Arts and Science

Grand Cordons of the Order of the Precious Crown
Recipients of the Grand Decoration with Sash for Services to the Republic of Austria
Dames Grand Cross of the Order of Isabella the Catholic
Grand Crosses Special Class of the Order of Merit of the Federal Republic of Germany
Grand Crosses of the Order of Beneficence (Greece)
Recipients of the Order of Propitious Clouds
20th-century rulers in Asia
Queen mothers